"Regulate" is a song performed by American rapper Warren G featuring American singer Nate Dogg. It was released in the spring of 1994 as the first single on the soundtrack to the film Above the Rim and later Warren G's debut album, Regulate... G Funk Era (1994). It became an MTV staple and the song reached No. 2 on the US Billboard Hot 100 and No. 8 on the R&B/Hip-Hop chart. "Regulate" was number 98 on VH1's 100 Greatest Songs of Hip Hop and number 108 on Pitchfork Medias "Top 200 Tracks of the 90s".

The West Coast hip hop track employs a four-bar sample of the rhythm of Michael McDonald's song "I Keep Forgettin' (Every Time You're Near)". It also samples "Sign of the Times" by Bob James and "Let Me Ride" by Dr. Dre. One mix of the song, called the Jamming Mix, includes full vocal samples from "I Keep Forgettin' (Every Time You're Near)". "Regulate" also starts with a read introduction referencing dialogue from the film Young Guns. The music video featured scenes from Above the Rim, including an appearance by Tupac Shakur.

Background 

In an interview with NME, Warren G explained the thought process behind the song. "That record was things that I went through, and friends of ours went through. We'd witnessed that and we'd been a part of it. We just told the story, and then on the hook we just let everybody's imagination flow. After hearing that you're going: 'Wow, he went through this' and then: [sings] 'I laid all them busters down, I let my gat explode' and you roll right back into it. It's on again!"

Synopsis 

Warren G is driving alone through Eastside, Long Beach, California at night, looking for women. He finds a group of men playing dice and tries to join them, but they pull out their guns and rob him instead. Thinking he's about to die, Warren G sings out, "if I had wings I would fly"; one critic describes this moment as "the hook" of the song. Meanwhile, Nate Dogg is looking for Warren G. He passes a car full of women, who are so fixated on him that they crash their car. He finds Warren G and shoots at the robbers, dispersing them. The two friends then return to the women and ride away with them, with the intent of taking them to the "Eastside motel". In the third verse, Warren and Nate explain their G-funk musical style; the song "constructs itself as inaugurating a new era".

Critical reception 

Bill Speed and John Martinucci from the Gavin Report noted that here, the hip hop artists "tap blue-eyed soulman Michael McDonald's "I Keep Forgettin'" for the music bed and the familiar groove fuels the duo's narrative raps as they "Regulate"." A reviewer from Music & Media commented, "Sung in a Bill Withers meets pioneer rapper Kurtis Blow timbre, there's something lovely old-fashioned about this soul number off the Above the Rim soundtrack." An editor, Maria Jimenez, viewed it as a "laidback lyric-flowing hip hop jam". Alan Jones from Music Week described it as a "mellow" song/rap sung over a sample of the 1986 remake. He added, "Sterling support from 2 Pac, Lord G and Treach/Riddler make this an excellent single." James Hamilton from the RM Dance Update deemed it a "lovely languid 0-95.3bpm US smash gangsta rap with catchy whistling". Charles Aaron from Spin commented, "Funny (or maybe not) how pop's young soul rebels sound more comfortably sincere when they're romancing their gats then when they're sweet-talking their ladies. Guess you gotta start somewhere. Anyway, as a rapper, Warren G's a regular-joe version of childhood bud Snoop Dogg; as a producer, his gangsta fantasyland is even more slickly diminished than big brother Dr. Dre. Imagine a stripped Mothership up on blocks with a fresh paint job."

Impact and analysis 

"Regulate" became Def Jam's biggest single. During much of the summer of 1994, the video stayed number one on the MTV charts. In the video as played on MTV, the lyrics are censored with the word "cold" being blanked from the line "Nate Dogg is about to make some bodies turn cold"; an action that Spin equated with racism because more explicit songs by white artists like Johnny Cash were not being censored. The video contained "everyday footage" from the film Above the Rim, as well as new footage, although guest vocalist Nate Dogg did not appear due to conflict between Suge Knight and Def Jam.

The lyrics have been described as "a surreal pastiche of half-sung lyrics about fighting and fucking". Craig Marks recommended "Regulate" for its "lite rock synth lines and rippling bass" but thought that Warren G's rapping abilities were "average". The mockumentary series Yacht Rock featured "Regulate" in its episode No. 7, where Michael McDonald and Kenny Loggins make a bet about the popularity of the song, "I Keep Forgettin' (Every Time You're Near)". Ten years later, the Long Beach-based rappers accidentally hit McDonald with their car and take him back to their house, where they sample McDonald's smooth keyboard groove.

Awards and nominations 

1995 MTV Movie Awards

 Best Movie Song – "Regulate" by Warren G and Nate Dogg (nominated)

1995 Grammy Awards

 Best Rap Performance by a Duo or Group - "Regulate" by Warren G and Nate Dogg (nominated)

Track listing 

Regulate was released as a maxi single by Interscope, catalog number 6544-95917-0 (12-inch vinyl) and 6544-95917-2 (CD), along with three other tracks.

 "Regulate" - Warren G (feat. Nate Dogg)
 "Pain" - 2Pac (feat. Stretch)
 "Mi Monie Rite" - Lord G
 "Loyal to the Game" - 2Pac (feat. Treach, Riddler)

Charts

Weekly charts

Year-end charts

Certifications

Remixes and covers 

 The song was covered live by Umphrey's McGee as early as 2007.

References

External links 

 "Regulate" music video

1994 debut singles
Nate Dogg songs
Warren G songs
G-funk songs
Songs written by Nate Dogg
1994 songs
Def Jam Recordings singles
Interscope Records singles
Death Row Records singles
Songs written by Warren G
Gangsta rap songs
American contemporary R&B songs